Kingsbury is a village municipality located in the Le Val-Saint-François Regional County Municipality of Quebec's Estrie region. It is completely surrounded by the township municipality of Melbourne.

The village is known for the lake and forest trails that encircle it, and the views from the mountain tops. Kingsbury is also the hometown to 1993 world champion pair skater Isabelle Brasseur.

History
In its early history, a train track cut through the village, but now the villagers' houses stand in its place.

Kingsbury is most famous for its slate quarry which was an important industry during the 19th century.  Men were hired from Wales and Cornwall to come to work the quarry where first-class slate was mined. This slate was sent all over the world. The quarry can still be seen although the trains and tracks are long gone.  Kingsbury was the first town to receive electricity.  In the evenings the villagers would sit on their balconies and sing the old songs from their homeland.

The nearby town of Richmond has an Interpretation Center for Slate which is housed in what was previously the French Presbyterian Church (Melbourne sector of Richmond).

Demographics 

Mother tongue (2011)

See also
List of village municipalities in Quebec

References

External links

Villages in Quebec
Incorporated places in Estrie